The Ministry of Interior of the Hashemite Kingdom of Jordan is the ministry in the Government of Jordan. Established in 1921, at the time of the establishment of the Emirate of Transjordan, it is responsible for law enforcement in Jordan. On 7 March 2020, Mazin Abdellah Hilal Al Farrayeh was appointed as minister by Prime Minister Bisher Al-Khasawneh.

The Ministry of Interior directs the Public Security Directorate; around 50,000 in 2016, the General Directorate of Gendarmerie, the Civil Defense Directorate and the Civil Status and Passports Department.

References

External links 

 

 
1921 establishments in Asia
Interior
Law enforcement agencies of Jordan
Jordan